Aminul Islam (born 29 December 1963) is a poet and essayist from Bangladesh. He has written 25 books including 20 books of poetry. He has been involved in creative writing for some 25 years. Aminul Islam is a popular poet and essayist of contemporary Bengali literature in Bangladesh. He is regarded as a powerful Bengali poet with poetic thought and language of his own. He has attained fame and popularity as a literary  researcher as well.

Early life and education

Aminul Islam was born on December 29, 1963, in the Chapai Nawabganj District, Bangladesh. He was a very meritorious student throughout his student life. He obtained his Higher Secondary School Certificate (HSC) from the famous age-old Rajshahi College. He took his bachelor's degree in social work from the University of Rajshahi and his Master of Arts from the same intuition. He obtained a Master of Social Science Degree from the Northern University of Bangladesh. He joined the Bangladesh Civil Service in 1988. He took part in various training programs at home and abroad. He likes to travel home and abroad and enjoy the nature and culture of different countries. He traveled and toured India, Italy, Indonesia, Malaysia, Philippines, Myanmar, Turkey, Australia, Spain, Portugal, Saudi Arabia, and the United Arab Emirates.

Literary life 

Aminul Islam was very fond of literature, particularly poetry since his boyhood. He loves music and songs equally. He started writing poetry in the student life. His first book of poems (Tantra Theke Doore) was published in 2002. He has 20 books of poetry, 3 book of child rhymes and 2 books of essays to his credit. He is one of the most discussed poets of his time in Bangladesh. Dozens of senior poets, critics and literary scholars have written articles                                                                         on his poetry and describes him as one of the powerful poet with distinctive style. 

Eminent Bengali novel and fiction writer, researcher and critic Hasnat Abdul Hye in one of his Bengali article described "....Such a poet can be described as 'born poet', 'devoted soul', 'recluse'. But reading his poems, it is understood that he is an original poet. He has created his own language for writing poetry which is both urban and realistic. The experience of everyday life is not only the subject of many of his poems, but he has also used many new words effortlessly and artistically. I don't hesitate to call him 'modern' for this feature. It is no exaggeration to say that he is the first poet of the digital age {এমন একজন কাব্যপ্রেমিককে ‘জাতকবি’, ‘নিবেদিতপ্রাণ’, ‘নিভৃতচারী’, এসব অভিধায় বর্ণনা করা যায়। কিন্তু তাঁর কবিতা পাঠ করলে বোঝা যায় তিনি একজন মৌলিক কবি। তিনি কবিতা লেখার জন্য নিজস্ব ভাষা নির্মাণ করেছেন যা একইসঙ্গে নাগরিক এবং বাস্তবতামন্ডিত। দৈনন্দিন জীবনের অভিজ্ঞতা শুধু তাঁর অনেক কবিতার বিষয় হয়নি, সেখানে ব্যবহৃত অনেক নতুন শব্দ তিনি অনায়াসে এবং শিল্পিত ভঙ্গিতে ব্যবহার করেছেন। এ বৈশিষ্ট্যের জন্য তাঁকে ‘আধুনিক’ বলতে দ্বিধা হয় না। তিনিই ডিজিটাল যুগের প্রথম কবিতা রচয়িতা, একথা বলা হলে অত্যুক্তি হবে না।}."

Renowned poet and critic Khyam Quader said "Poet Aminul Islam, in persuasion of the above-said points and tenets of poetry, I think, has fashioned a potential orb of poetic diction of his own. In this connection, Shafiuddin Ahmed, in his essay `Aminul Islam: The poet of Root Opulence', says- ''Making a cloister in his own world of speech and language sequence, he rises up to a brilliant splendor of his self-radiance''. (Dristy, Aminul Islam Issue by Biren Mukherjee; February, 2020, page-21. His manner of word-collection, pattern of word-stuffing, style of lingual presentation and seemliness, lexicographic dignity and sublimity, thought-releasing simplicity and the form of thematic reflections-- all are substantially and ornately special and different from his contemporaries. He picks and acquires his language from almost all the spheres of human situations, and bestows and endows them with multifarious essences of prevailing realism.

In his poetic vocabulary we notice spontaneous strolling of words from mythical and legendary fables and maxims, historical events, mystical gleves, traditional old country shades of nature-bound corny and ritualistic rustic life, bureaucratic phraseologies of deceiving senses, absorbing lingo-tongues from foreign paroles, most modern scientific and technological terminology and so on; and thus he fabricates a complex fusion of folksy, colloquial, dialectic, demotic, hierarchic and academic flavours of acoustic dealings in his poetry.

For this wide variety and diversity of sources of his philological fervours his similies, metaphors, conceits, alliterations, allusions, pictography, imagery and all other rhetorical and prosodic ingredients are found significantly rich and unique."

Evaluating and Appreciating poetic style of Aminul Islam critic and Principal of Bangladesh Co-operative Academy Anjan Kumar Sarkar in one of his articles said "He has personified all his subjects or objects. It is his speciality to make the object the subject. He has shown a great artistic capacity to make the romantic poems very simple easily enjoyable through dialogues and soliloquies and ventriloquism. His words come like the tide of the river very silently but completely, like the frost that covers the face of the earth, or the like the photoperiodic energy that makes the flower bloom.

He has a magic power over words, they come winged at a heat, on the spur of the occasion and have all the truth and vividness which arise from an actual impression of the objects. His religious zeal, political faith and attitude is secular but sound. Where there is injustice, lawlessness, brutality, suppression and oppression of the poor or women folk, his pen is uncompromised and unyielding there.

After the great Bengali poet Jibananada Das, no where except in Aminul Islam’s so many rivers, markets and bazars, fields and meadows, boatmen and boats, mythology and archeology, hills and plains, birds and flowers are found. He is indebted to his ancestral birthplace, the rivers flowing by his village, soil and nature of his village, He very innocently admitted this debt he bears in mind with gratitude. The Padma, the Shitalaxma, the Mohananda, the Pagla-Pangashmari and many other rivers are still fresh in his memory, and they move swiftly and smoothly in his dreams."

Shujayet Ullah, Director (Rtd), National Archives of Bangladesh pointed out, "Aminul Islam’s poetic style, his diction and expressions smack of archaeological overtone. History, tradition, social legacy & myth found novel meaning, new expression, in his poetry. Poets like Eliot, Jibonanda Das emphasized blending of tradition and individual talent for creative works. A poet is not a historian, but he does recreate history for the generation and while doing it his individual talent adds novelty to it. This he does by gathering experience from his day-to-day life, from his interactions with the society and by effective fusions with tradition and history. Thus we see how terms and terminologies used in officialdom crept into his poetry without much difficulty. Satiric tone, oblique comments and corrosive observation often find expression in sugar-coated language. And all this in no way impedes spontaneity of his poetry. And here, perhaps, lies Aminul Islam’s greatness.

It is a common knowledge that every successful poet enriches the language in which he writes poetry. Shakespeare’s and his contemporary’s contribution to the development of English language is known to the English speaking world. Aminul Islam gives new meaning or adds new dimension to the ordinary words which was hitherto unknown to the readers of Bengali language."

Former Student of English Literature, poet, researcher and a member of Bangladesh Civil Service Mashiur Rahman described poetic style of Aminul Islam, "Poet Aminul Islam, a widely known and highly discussed over poet of Bangladesh, has deservingly engraved his artistic footing stronger and deeper than most others in the literary world of contemporary Bangla poetry. Distinguished from most of the recent poets writing in Bangla in Bangladesh and India, Aminul Islam triggers closer attention of the readers and critics by his unique poetic style with certain instinctive features. To mention first of all, the uniqueness of his poetic beauty emanate from profound intensity he builds in his poetry which surprisingly arrest the aesthetic sense of the poetry loving readers as well as the critics. Next important feature of his style, I firmly believe many others also will convincingly agree with me, is his distinctive art of choosing words that amazingly bewilder the readers as well as the critics. This unusual feature clearly distinguishes him from a lot of others in the contemporary world. I would rather reiterate that his poetry gains a tremendous force from his deliberate, random and powerful use of unusual and seemingly un-poetic words, ordinary words from day-to-day life, words normally used in official language and words even harsh and unmusical. He also shows a superb art of exploring the possibilities and potentialities of Bangla words and their sounds. The poet uses simple words and their sound effects so artistically and skillfully that they achieve immense poetic value and catch keen attention of the readers. The poetic craftsmanship of Aminul Islam lies not only in what words he chooses for writing poems, but also how he places them to build the context and makes them highly meaningful in his poems; so clearly un-poetic, unmusical and even harsh words, by dint of his poetic handling, attain deeper meaning and create intense poetic essence".

Books 
 Tantra Theke Doore (poetry)
 Mahananda Ek Sonali Nodir Naam (poetry)
 Kuashar Barnamala (poetry)
Bishwayan, Bangla Kabita O Onnyannyo Probandha (collection of essays)
 Dadur Bari (child rhymes)
 Shes Hemonter Jochona (poetry)
Path Bendhe Dilo Bondhonhin Gronthi (poetry)
 Swapner Halkhata (poetry)
 Jaul Chithi Neel Swapner Duar (poetry)
 Shoroter Train Shraboner Luggage (poetry)
 Amar Valobasa Tomar Savings Account (poetry)
 Fagun Elo shohorey (rhymes)
 Railer Gari Lichur Desh (rhymes)
 Jochonar Raat Bedonar Behala (poetry)
 Pronoyee Nodir kache ( poetry)
 Kabitasamagra (poetry)
 Premsamagra (poetry)
 Valobasar Vugole (poetry)
 Nirbachita Kabita (poetry)
 Ovibasi Valobasa (poetry)
 Joler Akkhore Lekha Prempato (poetry)
 Bachhai Kabita (poetry)
 Premikar Jonyo Saar-Sangkkhep (poetry)
Hijoler Circuit House (poetry)
Nazrul Sangeet : Banir Baivab (research book on songs of Kazi Nazrul Islam)

Awards and honours
 Bogra Lekhok Chakra Swikriti  Award  2010.
 Nazrulsangeet Shilpi Parishas Sommanona 2013
 Abong  Manush Sommanona 2017
 Daag Sahitya Puroskar 2018
 Kobikunjo Award 2021  
 Purbo Poschimm Literature Award 2021  (পূর্ব পশ্চিম সাহিত্য পুরস্কার ২০২১ ) 
 IFIC Bank Literary Award 2021 
 Bindu Bisorgo Award, 2023 (বিন্দু বিসর্গ পদক, ২০২৩)

References

Further reading
 
 
 

 
 
 
 
 
 
 
 
 
 
 

Living people
1963 births
Bangladeshi male poets